The black-breasted leaf turtle (Geoemyda spengleri), also commonly called the Vietnamese leaf turtle or the black-breasted hill turtle, is a species of turtle in the family Geoemydidae (formerly called Bataguridae). The species is endemic to Southeast Asia.

Geographic range
G. spengleri is found in the wild in China, Vietnam and Laos.

Etymology
The specific name, spengleri, is in honor of Danish naturalist Lorenz Spengler.

Endangerment
Through locality samples from the three Chinese provinces Guangdong, Guangxi, and Hainan, the G. spengleri is found to be one of the surviving species due to its secretive terrestrial mode of life and small size. They are seen going extinct due to overexploitation and large-scale habitat alteration. The G. spengleri is still present in many regions where other chelonian species are extinct or near extinct.

References

Further reading
Wilke, Hartmut (1998). Tortoises and Box Turtles. New York: Barron's Educational Series, Hauppauge Inc.

External links
Gallery by Chelonia.org

Geoemyda
Turtles of Asia
Reptiles of China
Reptiles of Vietnam
Reptiles described in 1789
Taxa named by Johann Friedrich Gmelin
Endangered animals
Endangered biota of Asia
Taxonomy articles created by Polbot